Julia Creek may refer to:

Julia Creek (Light River tributary), see Light River (South Australia)
Julia Creek, Queensland, Australia, an outback town in the Shire of Mckinlay
Hundred of Julia Creek, South Australia

See also
 Julia, South Australia